Mehregi (also Romanized as Mehregī and Mahragī; also known as Maḩreqī) is a village in Byaban Rural District, Byaban District, Minab County, Hormozgan Province, Iran. At the 2006 census, its population was 333, in 61 families.

References 

Populated places in Minab County